Mirabegron, sold under the brand name Myrbetriq among others, is a medication used to treat overactive bladder. Its benefits are similar to antimuscarinic medication such as solifenacin or tolterodine. It is taken by mouth.

Common side effects include high blood pressure, headaches, and urinary tract infections. Other significant side effects include urinary retention, irregular heart rate, and angioedema. It works by activating the β3 adrenergic receptor in the bladder, resulting in its relaxation.

Mirabegron is the first clinically available beta-3 agonist with approval for use in adults with overactive bladder. Mirabegron was approved for medical use in the United States and in the European Union in 2012. In 2020, it was the 160th most commonly prescribed medication in the United States, with more than 3million prescriptions. It is available as a generic medication.

In the United Kingdom it is less preferred to antimuscarinic medication such as oxybutynin.

Medical uses

Mirabegron is used is in the treatment of overactive bladder. It works equally well to antimuscarinic medication such as solifenacin or tolterodine. In the United Kingdom it is less preferred to these agents.

Mirabegron is also indicated to treat neurogenic detrusor overactivity (NDO), a bladder dysfunction related to neurological impairment, in children ages three years and older.

Adverse effects

Adverse effects by incidence:

Very common (>10% incidence) adverse effects include:
 Elevated blood pressure

Common (1–10% incidence) adverse effects include:
 Dry mouth
 Nasopharyngitis
 Urinary tract infection (UTI)
 Headache
 Influenza
 Constipation
 Dizziness
 Joint pain
 Cystitis
 Back pain
 Upper respiratory tract infection (URTI)
 Sinusitis
 Diarrhea
 High heart rate
 Fatigue
 Abdominal pain
 Neoplasms (cancers)

Rare (<1% incidence) adverse effects include:
 Palpitations
 Blurred vision
 Glaucoma
 Indigestion
 Gastritis
 Abdominal distension
 Rhinitis
 Elevations in liver enzymes (GGTP, AST, ALT and LDH)
 Renal and urinary disorders (e.g., nephrolithiasis, bladder pain)
 Reproductive system disorders (e.g., vulvovaginal pruritus, vaginal infection)
 Skin and subcutaneous tissue disorders (e.g., urticaria, leukocytoclastic vasculitis, rash, pruritus, purpura, lip edema)
 Stevens–Johnson syndrome associated with increased serum ALT, AST and bilirubin
 Urinary retention

References

Further reading

External links
 

Astellas Pharma
Beta3-adrenergic agonists
CYP2D6 inhibitors
Phenethylamines
Phenylethanolamines
Thiazoles
Wikipedia medicine articles ready to translate